"So Young" is a song by the Irish folk rock band the Corrs from their second studio album, Talk on Corners (1997). Written about the band members' parents, the song was released as the album's fifth (sixth if counting the Tin Tin Out remix of "What Can I Do") single in November 1998. For its single release, British electronic music group K-Klass remixed "So Young"; this version charted in several countries, reaching the top 40 in Ireland, Iceland, and the United Kingdom.

Release
It is written by Sharon Corr and is a song about her parents, Jean and Gerry Corr, who she believed were "forever young". The single is a remix by K-Klass. It reached number 29 on the Irish Singles Chart and number six in the United Kingdom. The band initially had to fight with their label to include the song on the album, a decision vindicated by its popularity.

The K-Klass remix contains an extra section for the first verse, which was deleted from the album version for unexplained reasons (on the demo version, both the first and second verses were constructed as a single long verse, with the extra verse serving as the second shorter verse). Since May 1998, the band have performed the song with the extra verse included.

Critical reception
The song received positive reviews. Larry Flick from Billboard wrote about the song, "This K-Klass remix of "So Young" has been funked up just enough to better parallel U.S. programming trends and is as bright and inviting as anything we're hearing in power rotation these days. The Corrs are completely in control of the variables at hand, with a beautiful, uptempo melody line, crisp harmonies, right-on production, and, yes, a chorus that might just stick in the hearts of listeners given the chance to at last get to know this phenomenal Irish family quartet. Let's do it!" James Hunter from Rolling Stone described it as "vibrantly".

Music video

The accompanying music video for "So Young" was shot in Chicago as the Corrs were on tour in the US at that time (21 October 1998). Much shooting took place in and around the Flamingo Building. The structure that gives the building its name is 53 floors high and was designed by Alexander Calder in 1974. The Corrs are standing on the top of the Flamingo Building throwing paper planes into the windy air.

Track listings

 UK CD1 and Australian CD single
 "So Young" (K-Klass remix) – 4:12
 "Forgiven, Not Forgotten" – 4:15
 "Haste to the Wedding" (acoustic) – 3:00

 UK CD2
 "So Young" (live) – 4:27
 "When He's Not Around" (live) – 5:13
 "Joy of Life (Carraroe Jig)" (live) – 4:44
 Tracks were recorded live at the Royal Albert Hall, London, on 17 March 1998

 UK cassette single
 "So Young" (K-Klass remix) – 4:12
 "Forgiven, Not Forgotten" – 4:15

 European CD single
 "So Young" (K-Klass remix) – 4:14
 "Haste to the Wedding" (acoustic) – 3:00

Credits and personnel
Credits are lifted from the UK CD1 liner notes.

Studios
 Recorded at Ollywood Studios (Hollywood, California, US)
 Engineered at The Bunker (Wrexham, Wales)

Personnel

 The Corrs – writing
 Sharon Corr – lyrics
 Jim Corr – production
 Anto Drennan – guitars
 Gota Yashiki, Groove Activator – drums
 Paul "Biggy" Birchall – additional keyboards

 Oliver Leiber – production, recording
 K-Klass – remix, additional production
 Barry Rudolph – recording
 Leo Pearson – programming
 James Reynolds – mix engineering

Charts

Release history

References

1997 songs
1998 singles
143 Records singles
Atlantic Records singles
The Corrs songs
Lava Records singles
Songs written by Andrea Corr
Songs written by Caroline Corr
Songs written by Jim Corr
Songs written by Sharon Corr